Torped 613 (TP613) is a heavyweight torpedo still in use by the Swedish Navy. It is wire-guided and has a passive sonar sensor, which sends back information through the wire. The torpedo was developed in the 1970s as a cooperation project between Denmark, Norway and Sweden. Testing was done during the period 1981-1983.

Like the older Swedish version Torped 61 introduced in the mid-1960s, it is driven by alcohol and hydrogen peroxide, which gives long range and a minimum exhaust trail.

The torpedo is planned to be replaced by the more modern Torped 62.

Short history of the TP61-series torpedoes:
 TP61, ca 1970 (developed from several previous HTP-propulsioned torpedoes starting in 1955): Straightrunning anti-surface torpedo for use with submarines and surface vessels.
 TP611: Wireguided version of the TP61.
 TP612: Further development of the TP611 with "swim-out" launch from submarinetubes and improved noise-profile.
 TP618, ca 1980: Export-version of the TP612 (increased speed and less noise-reduction).
 TP613, ca 1982: Development of the TP612 with passive-hydrophone targetseeker and pistol. Two-way datacommunication and engine with two speeds which could be changed during the run.
 TP617, ca 1982: Export-version of the TP613 (identical, with some degraded parametres in software for hydrophone-control and pistol giving it a slightly reduced performance).

References

 

Torpedoes of Sweden